Candido was an Italian language satirical magazine published in Milan, Italy, between 1945 and 1961.

History and profile

Candido was started in 1945 as a successor of another satirical magazine Bertoldo.  It was cofounded by Giovannino Guareschi, Giaci Mondaini and Giovanni Mosca on the request of the Italian publisher Angelo Rizzoli. The magazine was published on a weekly basis, and its headquarters was in Milan. Giovannino Guareschi also served as the editor-in-chief of the magazine and resigned from the post in 1957. However, he continued to contribute to the weekly. In the period 1952–1953 Candido sold 180,000–200,000 copies. Later its circulation reached 225,000 copies.

The magazine had a monarchist and moderately conservative stance. It frequently published cartoons featuring the major political figures of the period, including Christian democrat Alcide De Gasperi and communist Palmiro Togliatti. Candido ceased publication in 1961.

See also
 List of magazines in Italy

References

External links

1945 establishments in Italy
1961 disestablishments in Italy
Conservatism in Italy
Conservative magazines
Defunct magazines published in Italy
Italian-language magazines
Magazines established in 1945
Magazines disestablished in 1961
Magazines published in Milan
Satirical magazines published in Italy
Weekly magazines published in Italy